María Victoria Angulo González (born 28 January 1975) is a Colombian politician who served as Minister of National Education from 2018 to 2022.

References

See also 

 Council of Ministers of Colombia

1975 births
Living people
Colombian Ministers of National Education

21st-century Colombian economists
21st-century Colombian politicians
21st-century Colombian women politicians
Women government ministers of Colombia